The trigonometric functions (especially sine and cosine) for real or complex square matrices occur in solutions of second-order systems of differential equations. They are defined by the same Taylor series that hold for the trigonometric functions of real and complex numbers:

with  being the th power of the matrix , and  being the identity matrix of appropriate dimensions. 

Equivalently, they can be defined using the matrix exponential along with the matrix equivalent of Euler's formula, yielding 

For example, taking  to be a standard Pauli matrix,

one has

as well as, for the cardinal sine function,

Properties
The analog of the Pythagorean trigonometric identity holds:

The analogs of the trigonometric addition formulas are true if and only if :

Other functions
The tangent, as well as inverse trigonometric functions, hyperbolic and inverse hyperbolic functions have also been defined for matrices:
 (see Inverse trigonometric functions#Logarithmic forms, Matrix logarithm, Square root of a matrix)

and so on.

References

Trigonometry
Matrix theory